Tarzan's Desert Mystery is a 1943 American Tarzan film directed by Wilhelm Thiele and starring Johnny Weissmuller and Nancy Kelly.

Like its immediate predecessor, Tarzan Triumphs, the film mentions Tarzan's mate, Jane, but does not show her on screen. The explanation for her absence, as in the earlier film, is that she is still in the United Kingdom helping the war effort. (Maureen O'Sullivan had played Jane in the first six of Weissmuller's Tarzan films, but when the character of Jane returned after a two-picture absence, she was played by Brenda Joyce, not O'Sullivan.)

The picture's supporting players include Johnny Sheffield as "Boy", Otto Kruger, Joe Sawyer, Robert Lowery and John Dehner in an unbilled role as Prince Ameer.

Plot
Tarzan receives a request from Jane, who is helping out on the British home front in World War II, to locate a rare plant-derived serum that can save the lives of many service members. He sets off into the Sahara, which is the shortest route to the place where the plants can be found. Boy and Cheetah tag along, and soon they are joined by a rambunctious horse and traveling magician Connie Bryce (Nancy Kelly), who has been entertaining Allied soldiers in the region.

The group travels to Connie's next destination, a small Arab kingdom in the desert. Tarzan intends to drop her off and continue his journey, not knowing that she is on a secret mission from Washington to thwart Nazi spies who have infiltrated the kingdom. Tarzan and Connie quickly run afoul of these devious agents, who manage to frame the two for crimes against the royal family. The apeman leads a daring escape with the help of Cheetah. Then, with the Nazis hot on their heels, the travelers head for the strange prehistoric jungle where the serum plants grow.

Cast

 Johnny Weissmuller as Tarzan
 Nancy Kelly as Connie Bryce
 Johnny Sheffield as Boy
 Otto Kruger as Paul Hendrix
 Joe Sawyer as Karl Straeder
 Lloyd Corrigan as Sheik Abdul El Khim
 Robert Lowery as Prince Selim
 Frank Puglia as Magistrate
 Philip Van Zandt as Kushmet
 Bobby Barber as Turban Vendor (uncredited)
 John Berkes as Charlie (uncredited)
 John Dehner as Prince Ameer (uncredited)
 Frank Faylen as Achmed (uncredited)
 George J. Lewis as Ali Baba Hassan (uncredited)
 Nestor Paiva as Prison Guard (uncredited)
 Syd Saylor as Bewildered Camel Herdsman (uncredited)

References

External links

 
 
 
 
 ERBzine Silver Screen: Tarzan's Desert Mystery

1943 films
1940s fantasy adventure films
American black-and-white films
American fantasy adventure films
American sequel films
American World War II propaganda films
1940s English-language films
Films set in deserts
Tarzan films
Films produced by Sol Lesser
Films scored by Paul Sawtell